Gangsters is the tenth novel by Swedish author Klas Östergren, published in 2005. It is a free-standing sequel from 1980 novel Gentlemen.

It was translated into English by Tiina Nunnally in 2009.

References

External links

2005 Swedish novels
Novels by Klas Östergren
Swedish-language novels
Novels set in Stockholm
Albert Bonniers Förlag books